The old fashioned is a cocktail made by muddling sugar with bitters and water, adding whiskey (typically rye or bourbon), and garnishing with an orange slice or zest and a cocktail cherry. It is traditionally served with ice in an old fashioned glass (also known as a rocks glass).

Developed during the 19th century and given its name in the 1880s, it is an IBA Official Cocktail. It is also one of six basic drinks listed in David A. Embury's The Fine Art of Mixing Drinks.

History
An old fashioned was one of the simpler and earlier versions of cocktails, before the development of advanced bartending techniques and recipes in the later part of the 19th century. The first documented definition of the word "cocktail" was in response to a reader's letter asking to define the word in the 6 May 1806, issue of The Balance and Columbian Repository in Hudson, New York. In the 13 May 1806, issue, the paper's editor wrote that it was a potent concoction of spirits, bitters, water, and sugar; it was also referred to at the time as a bittered sling and is essentially the recipe for an old fashioned.
J.E. Alexander describes the cocktail similarly in 1833, as he encountered it in New York City, as being rum, gin, or brandy, significant water, bitters, and sugar, though he includes a nutmeg garnish as well.

By the 1860s, it was common for orange curaçao, absinthe, and other liqueurs to be added to the cocktail. As cocktails became more complex, drinkers accustomed to simpler cocktails began to ask bartenders for something akin to the pre-1850s drinks. The original concoction, albeit in different proportions, came back into vogue, and was referred to as "old-fashioned". The most popular of the in-vogue "old-fashioned" cocktails were made with whiskey, according to a Chicago barman, quoted in the Chicago Daily Tribune in 1882, with rye being more popular than Bourbon. The recipe he describes is a similar combination of spirits, bitters, water, and sugar of seventy-six years earlier.

The Pendennis Club, a gentlemen's club founded in 1881 in Louisville, Kentucky, claims the old-fashioned cocktail was invented there. The recipe was said to have been invented by a bartender at that club in honor of Colonel James E. Pepper, a prominent bourbon distiller, who brought it to the Waldorf-Astoria Hotel bar in New York City. Cocktail critic David Wonderich finds this origin story unlikely, however, as the first mention in print of "old fashioned cocktails" was in the Chicago Daily Tribune in February 1880, before the Pendennis Club was opened; this in addition to the fact that the old fashioned was simply a re-packaging of a drink that had long existed.

With its purported conception rooted in the city's history, in 2015 the city of Louisville named the old fashioned as its official cocktail. Each year, during the first two weeks of June, Louisville celebrates "Old Fashioned Fortnight", which encompasses bourbon events, cocktail specials, and National Bourbon Day which is always celebrated on 14 June.

In January 2020, drinks journal Drinks International reported the old fashioned to be the top selling classic cocktail internationally, for the 6th straight year, based on its annual poll of 100 global bars.

Recipe
George Kappeler provides several of the earliest published recipes for old-fashioned cocktails in his 1895 book. Recipes are given for whiskey, brandy, Holland gin, and Old Tom gin. The whiskey old fashioned recipe specifies the following (with a jigger being ):

By the 1860s, as illustrated by Jerry Thomas's 1862 book, basic cocktail recipes included Curaçao or other liqueurs. These liqueurs were not mentioned in the early 19th century descriptions, nor the Chicago Daily Tribune descriptions of the "old-fashioned" cocktails of the early 1880s; they were absent from Kappeler's old-fashioned recipes as well. The differences of the old-fashioned cocktail recipes from the cocktail recipes of the late 19th Century are mainly preparation methods, the use of sugar and water in lieu of simple or gum syrup, and the absence of additional liqueurs. These old-fashioned cocktail recipes are literally for cocktails done the old-fashioned way.

A book by David Embury published in 1948 provides a slight variation, specifying 12 parts American whiskey, 1 part simple syrup, 1–3 dashes Angostura bitters, a twist of lemon peel over the top, and serve garnished with the lemon peel. Two additional recipes from the 1900s vary in the precise ingredients but omit the cherry which was introduced after 1930 as well as the soda water which the occasional recipe calls for. Orange bitters were a popular ingredient in the late 19th century.

Modifications
The original old fashioned recipe would have showcased the whiskey available in America in the 19th century: Irish, Bourbon or rye whiskey. But in some regions, especially Wisconsin, brandy is substituted for whiskey (sometimes called a brandy old fashioned). Eventually the use of other spirits became common, such as a gin recipe becoming popularized in the late 1940s.

Common garnishes for an old fashioned include an orange slice or a maraschino cherry or both, although these modifications came around 1930, some time after the original recipe was invented. While some recipes began making sparse use of the orange zest for flavor, the practice of muddling orange and other fruit gained prevalence as late as the 1990s.

Some modern variants have greatly sweetened the old-fashioned, e.g. by adding blood orange soda to make a fizzy old-fashioned, or muddled strawberries to make a strawberry old-fashioned.

Modern versions may also include elaborately carved ice; though cocktail critic David Wondrich notes that this, along with essentially all other adornments or additions, goes against the simple spirit of the old-fashioned.

Cultural impact
The old fashioned is the cocktail of choice of Don Draper, the lead character on the Mad Men television series, set in the 1960s. The use of the drink in the series coincided with a renewed interest in this and other classic cocktails in the 2000s.

It was also the basis of an oft-quoted line from the movie It's a Mad, Mad, Mad, Mad World, when boozy pilot Jim Backus decides to make the cocktail and leaves passenger Buddy Hackett to fly the plane. When Hackett asks, "What if something happens?", Backus replies, "What could happen to an old-fashioned?" This scene is satirized in Archer season 3 episode 1 ("Heart of Archness") when Sterling Archer attempts to make an old fashioned on Rip Riley's seaplane but lacks the basic ingredients.

The cocktail is the subject of the Cole Porter song ”Make It Another Old-Fashioned, Please”, although the song asks to leave out the cherries, orange and bitters, making it simply a straight round of whisky.

See also

Cuisine of Kentucky
History of Louisville, Kentucky
List of cocktails
Sazerac

References

Further reading

External links
Old fashioned recipe, esquire.com
Old fashioned with Bourbon, thebar.com 

Cocktails with whisky
Cocktails with Angostura bitters
Cuisine of Louisville, Kentucky
History of Louisville, Kentucky
Ancestral cocktails